Leotia atrovirens is a species of mushroom. The edibility of this mushroom is unknown. The cap is green, as it matures it becomes dark green. The cap is lumpy, when young it is slimy or sticky. The stem can range from light green to dark green. The spore print is white. It has no gills. The fruiting body is gelatinous. It usually grow near together in large to small cluster under conifers trees. They also grow well in dead stumps and moist soil.

External links
 Leotia atrovirens at Mushroom Expert

Helotiales
Fungi of North America